John Kelly (March 23, 1855 − July 18, 1900) was an American politician from New York.

Life 
John was born on March 23, 1855, in Manhattan, the son of Peter Kelly and Rose McLeone. He was baptized a week later in the Church of St. Joseph in Greenwich Village. His parents were Irish immigrants.

The Kelly family moved to Brooklyn when John was very young. After graduating from St. Francis Xavier College in Manhattan, he joined his father's building business. They built a number of houses in South Brooklyn.

A Democrat, John unsuccessfully ran for Supervisor as an Independent in 1886. In 1888, he was elected to the New York State Assembly, representing the Kings County 5th District. He served in the Assembly in 1889, 1890, 1891, 1892, and 1893.

John died on July 18, 1900, at his home on 161 Coffey St. He was buried in Holy Cross Cemetery in Flatbush.

References

External links 
Political Graveyard

1855 births
1900 deaths
Politicians from Brooklyn
Democratic Party members of the New York State Assembly
Catholics from New York (state)
Burials at Holy Cross Cemetery, Brooklyn
19th-century American politicians
Xavier High School (New York City) alumni
American people of Irish descent